Dypsis intermedia is a species of flowering plant in the family Arecaceae that is found only in Madagascar. It is threatened by habitat loss.

References

intermedia
Endemic flora of Madagascar
Critically endangered plants
Taxonomy articles created by Polbot
Taxa named by Henk Jaap Beentje